Xue Fei (Chinese: 薛飞; born 29 October 1987 in Beijing) is a Chinese football player who plays for China League Two side Sichuan Jiuniu.

Club career
In 2007,Xue Fei started his professional footballer career with Chinese Super League side Beijing Guoan. He would eventually make his league debut for Beijing on 15 September 2009 in a game against Changchun Yatai, coming on as a substitute for Yang Hao in the 68th minute.

In March 2011, Xue transferred to China League One side Beijing Baxy.

Club career statistics 
Statistics accurate as of match played 13 October 2018.

References

1987 births
Living people
Chinese footballers
Footballers from Beijing
Beijing Guoan F.C. players
Beijing Sport University F.C. players
Sichuan Jiuniu F.C. players
Chinese Super League players
China League One players
Association football midfielders